Acacia dunnii, commonly known as elephant ear wattle or Dunn's wattle, is a shrub or tree of the genus Acacia and the subgenus Plurinerves.

Names 
Its specific epithet, dunnii, is to honour Edward Dunn, government geologist for Victoria (1904–1912).  Aboriginal names for it are: (in) Jaminjung, Ngaliwurru, Nungali: Bawaya (Jam, Ngal); (in) Ngarinyman: Barrawi.

Description 
This small shrub or tree flowers and fruits in all months of the year.
It blooms from January to June and produces yellow flowers.
A. dunnii generally has only a single stem. After flowering brown woody seed pods form.

Taxonomy 
The species was formally described by the botanist William Bertram Turrill in 1922 in the work Dunn's Wattle as published in the Bulletin of Miscellaneous Information. Synonyms for the plant include Racosperma dunnii as described by Leslie Pedley and Acacia sericata var. dunnii by Joseph Maiden.

Distribution 
It is native to an area in the Northern Territory and the Kimberley region of Western Australia. Despite records for Queensland, the Commonwealth Heads of Australian Herbaria consider A dunnii not to be native to Queensland, but to have become naturalised.
It grows on shallow skeletal sandy soils, over sandstone or quartzite Often found on ridges, stony hills and amongst rocks and rocky outcrops.

See also 
 List of Acacia species

References

External links 
 Worldwide wattle: Acacia dunnii
 Flora of the Northern Territory: Mimosaceae

dunnii
Acacias of Western Australia
Flora of the Northern Territory
Plants described in 1922
Taxa named by Joseph Maiden